Château Suau is a  French vineyard located south of  the village of Capian in  the  Bordeaux area. It sits at the highest point of the Cadillac-côtes-de-Bordeaux appellation.<ref> Legifrance.gouv [http://www.legifrance.gouv.fr/affichTexte.do?cidTexte=JORFTEXT000021218419&dateTexte=vig Official decree on Côtes-de-Bordeaux appellation]</ref> Château Suau produces organic wines.

History
According to legends, Château Suau began as a hunting lodge in the 16th century . At the time, it belonged to Jean Louis de Nogaret de La Valette, Duke of Épernon. It was not until 1637 that it was restored and named in honor of the new owners: the Suau family. The estate was bought in 1687 by a wine merchant named Clement Popp of Bordeaux described as the  Lord of Suau. At one point in its history the estate belonged to Franco-Columbus Fenwick, U.S consul in Nantes. In 1857, the domain passed into the hands of Jean Guénant,  Receiver general of  the island Réunion who, with the help of his son, had to fight the phylloxera epidemic of 1870, introducing the first vine grafts.Chateausuau.com The estate was sold and resold several times before being acquired in 1986 by the current owner: the Bonnet family. Hachette Vins.com Monique Bonnet

Wine and grapes

Facing south-southeast, this Entre-Deux-Mers vineyard has a soil consisting mainly of clay and gravel.
It is planted with Merlot 51%, Cabernet Sauvignon 28%, Cabernet Franc 4% and Malbec 3% grapes for the reds.
Sauvignon blanc 8%, Sauvignon gris 1% and Sémillon 5% for the whites.The wine cellar insider.com
The planting density  is  5000 plants / ha for white vines and 7000 vines / ha for red vines.
In 2008, the estate started  progressively to convert into organic farming. The conversion was completed in 2012 and since 2014, the entire production is organic wines.

The first certified organic wine  was the Château Maubert 2011 (Cadillac-AOC- Côtes-de-Bordeaux).

Each year, the estate produces a Château Suau Rouge AOC - Côte-de-Bordeaux -, a Château Rouge AOC - Côte Maubert Bordeaux-. As well as the Château Suau Bordeaux AOC - Bordeaux Blanc Sec- and the Château Suau Rosé.

Château Suau, Red Artolie Cadillac AOC - Côtes-de-Bordeaux-, Château Suau Red Cadillac, AOC- Cadillac Côtes-de-Bordeaux- and Château Suau Sweet White Cadillac AOC, (Dessert wines),  are produced only when the quality of the grapes is  good enough to achieve these cuvées.Concours de Bordeaux

In 2013, Château Suau joined the first Bordeaux wines association for an Environmental management system (EMS)  and is Ecovert and  ISO 14001 certified.

Bibliography
 GUILLON Edouard - Historic Castles and wine of the Gironde - Bordeaux: Coderc, and Degréteau Poujol. 1866-1869, Vol 4, p. 393.
 Manthe René, The Barony of Capian and the Priory of Artolée - historical and archaeological Notes - Bordeaux Archaeological Society 1892 - t XVII, p. 55 - 57
 Cocks & Féret: .
 Charles Cocks, Edouard Feret: Bordeaux et ses vins'', G. Masson, 1922, (9th edition), 1886, and 3rd edition,1874.

See also
 Regional Bordeaux AOCs
 List of grape varieties
 Terroir

References

External links
  Château Suau official site

Bordeaux wine producers
Châteaux in Gironde
Cultural heritage of France
French wine AOCs
Organic farming in France